Long Island is an uninhabited island lying in the southern part of Willapa Bay in Pacific County, Washington, United States. It is the site of the Willapa National Wildlife Refuge, part of the U.S. National Wildlife Refuge System.

See also
 Long Island, New York

References
Long Island: Blocks 3188 thru 3191, Census Tract 9504, Pacific County, Washington United States Census Bureau
Willapa National Wildlife Refuge United States Fish and Wildlife Service

Islands of Washington (state)
Landforms of Pacific County, Washington
Uninhabited islands of Washington (state)
Pacific islands of Washington (state)